The Seven Network (commonly known as Channel Seven or simply Seven) is a major Australian commercial free-to-air television network. It is owned by Seven West Media Limited, and is one of five main free-to-air television networks in Australia. The network's headquarters are located in Sydney.

As of 2014, it is the second-largest network in the country in terms of population reach. The Seven Network shows various nonfiction shows—such as news broadcasts (Seven News) and sports programing—as well as fiction shows. In 2011, the network won all 40 out of 40 weeks of the ratings season for total viewers, being the first to achieve this since the introduction of the OzTAM ratings system in 2001. 

As of 2022, the Seven Network is the highest-rated television network in Australia, ahead of the Nine Network, ABC TV, Network 10 and SBS.

Headquarters
Seven's administration headquarters are in Eveleigh, Sydney, completed in 2003. National news and current affairs programming are based between flagship station ATN-7 in Sydney and HSV-7 in Melbourne. In 2009, Seven moved its Sydney-based production operations from Epping to a purpose-built high-definition television production facility at the Australian Technology Park in Eveleigh.

History

Origins
The present Seven Network began as a group of independent stations in Sydney, Melbourne, Brisbane, Adelaide and Perth. HSV-7 Melbourne, licensed to The Herald and Weekly Times Ltd (owners of two local papers at the time, The Herald and The Sun), was launched on 4 November 1956, the first station in the country to use the VHF7 frequency. ATN-7 Sydney, licensed to Amalgamated Television Services, a subsidiary of Fairfax, was launched on 2 December 1956. The two stations did not immediately share resources, and instead formed content-sharing partnerships with their VHF9 counterparts by 1957: ATN-7 partnered with Melbourne's GTV-9, while HSV-7 paired up with Sydney's TCN-9. TVW-7 Perth, licensed to TVW Limited, a subsidiary of West Australian Newspapers, publisher of The West Australian, began broadcasting almost two years later, on 16 October 1959, as the city's first commercial station. BTQ-7 Brisbane followed on 1 November, signing on as Brisbane's second commercial television station. ADS-7 Adelaide was launched on 24 October 1959 as the final capital city VHF7 station. The station later swapped frequencies with SAS-10 on 27 December 1987 as ADS-10 and SAS-7.

HSV-7 began its relationship with the Victorian Football League (now the Australian Football League) in April 1957, when the station broadcast the first live Australian rules football match. Throughout this time, the stations operated independently of each other, with schedules made up of various simple, and relatively inexpensive, programs, such as Pick a Box and spinoffs of popular radio shows. In the early 1960s, coaxial cable links, formed initially between Sydney and Melbourne, allowed the sharing of programmes and simultaneous broadcasts of live shows.

In 1960, Frank Packer, the owner of Sydney's TCN-9, bought a controlling share of Melbourne's GTV-9, in the process creating the country's first television network (unofficially called "the National Nine Network") and dissolving the ATN-7/GTV-9 and the HSV-7/TCN-9 partnerships. Left without their original partners, ATN-7 and HSV-7 joined to form the Australian Television Network in 1963. The new grouping was soon joined by other capital-city channel 7 stations, ADS-7 Adelaide and BTQ-7 Brisbane. The new network began to produce and screen higher-budget programs to attract viewers, most notably Homicide, a series which would continue for another 12 years to become the nation's longest running drama series. However, it was not until 1970, after the network adopted the Network 7 name, that a national network logo was adopted, albeit still with independently owned and operated stations with local advertising campaigns.

Colour television was introduced across the network in 1975, when a new colour logo was adopted. Rupert Murdoch made an unsuccessful bid for the Herald and Weekly Times, owners of HSV-7, in 1979, later going on to gain control of rival ATV-10. Fairfax, however, successfully bought a 14.9% share of the company later in the same year.

1980s
The 1980s saw the introduction of stereo sound, as well as a number of successful shows, most notably A Country Practice in 1981, and Sons and Daughters, which began in 1982. Wheel of Fortune began its 25-year run in July 1981, produced from ADS-7's studios in Adelaide. The 1980 Summer Olympics in Moscow were shown live on the network the year before. Neighbours began on Seven in 1985, but low ratings in Sydney led to the cancellation of the new series at the end of the year, which later moved to Network Ten and went on to achieve international success.

Perth based businessman Robert Holmes à Court, through his business the Bell Group, bought TVW-7 from its original owners, West Australian Newspapers in 1982. It was in 1984 that the network proceeded to drop the "Network 7" branding.  The Herald and Weekly Times, owner of HSV-7 and ADS-7, was sold to Rupert Murdoch in December 1986 for an estimated A$1.8 billion. Murdoch's company, News Limited, sold off HSV-7 to Fairfax soon afterwards, for $320 million. Fairfax went on to axe a number of locally produced shows in favour of networked content from its Sydney counterpart, ATN-7 (also owned by Fairfax at the time).

Cross-media ownership laws introduced in 1987 forced Fairfax to choose between its print and television operations – it chose the former, and later sold off its stations to Qintex Ltd., owned by businessman Christopher Skase. Qintex had previously bought, and subsequently sold off, stations in Brisbane and regional Queensland before taking control of the network. It was also in 1987 that the network returned to the "Australian Television Network" branding. The next year, another new logo was introduced along with evening soap Home and Away and a relaunched Seven National News, now known as Seven News. The network became truly national in 1988 when Skase bought TVW-7 for $130 million. In 1991, the network changed its name once again to the Seven Network, though it had been unofficially using that name for some time before then.

Despite the network's successes, a failed $1.5 billion bid for MGM Studios in the same year sent Qintex into receivership. Christopher Skase fled Australia in 1990 to escape extradition. The business' assets were bundled together by receivers and made into a new company, the Seven Network Limited, in 1991.

1990s
Real Life, a national current-affairs programme hosted by Stan Grant, similar in format to the Nine Network's A Current Affair, was launched in 1992 but was later replaced by the more successful Today Tonight.

The network was listed on the stock exchange in 1993, soon after the entry of subscription television provider Australis. One of Seven's most popular series, A Country Practice, ended in 1993 after 1058 episodes. 1993 saw the introduction of Blue Heelers, which after a number of timeslot changes, was moved in 1998 to Wednesdays. This was to make room for a new series, medical drama All Saints. Both dramas rated quite highly, and along with new lifestyle shows Better Homes and Gardens and The Great Outdoors, resulted in a stronger ratings position for the network.

In 1995, Sunshine Television, a Seven Network affiliate in regional Queensland, was purchased by the network's parent company, Seven Network Limited. Sunshine Television's regional stations effectively became a part of the Seven Network, identical in appearance and programming to the rest of the business' stations. Australian Gladiators Series 1 and Series 2 in 1995-1996 filmed in Brisbane, and Series 3 filmed in Sydney  proved popular. Seven Queensland won the annual audience ratings for the first time in 1998.

A successful $1.3 billion bid for United Artists was made in conjunction with Kirk Kerkorian in 1996; the network sold its stake two years later for $US389 million. Seven took control of Australia Television, the Australian Broadcasting Corporation's Asian satellite channel, in 1997. The Australian Broadcasting Corporation still maintained a share in the network, and continued to produce news and current affairs programming for it.

2000s

During the late 1990s and early 2000s, a state-of-the-art high definition national broadcast facility was constructed in Docklands, Melbourne, replacing the previous facility in Epping, Sydney. This new facility would also house HSV-7's Melbourne offices and studios.

The year 2000 saw former Nine executive David Leckie appointed as head of television operations, re-launching the network with an updated logo, new advertising campaign in time for the network's coverage of the 2000 Summer Olympics in Sydney. The opening ceremony was one of the highest-ever rating television programmes in the country, with 6.5 million viewers, contributing to the network winning the ratings year for the first time in twenty-two years.

Digital television was introduced to most of the network's coverage area on 1 January 2001. This was soon followed by the gradual introduction of wide screen and high definition programming.

In January 2006, the Seven Network, Pacific Magazines and online portal Yahoo! Australia and New Zealand combined in a joint venture to form Yahoo!7, representing all three companies' online assets.

7HD was officially announced on 15 September 2007, with the Seven Media Group announcing their intention to start a high definition multichannel, that was initially expected to launch in December 2007. However, 7HD became the first free-to-air commercial television channel introduced to metropolitan areas since 1988, when it launched prior on 15 October 2007, with 25th Hour being the first programme broadcast at 10:30 pm.

On 14 February 2008, the Seven Media Group and Foxtel officially signed an agreement allowing Seven's digital signal to be transmitted via Foxtel's cable and satellite services. Seven became available on Foxtel in early 2009.

On 25 September 2009, Seven announced its new digital channel, 7two, which officially launched on 1 November 2009.

2010s
On 18 January 2010, Seven launched the online catch-up TV website called PLUS7;.

On 25 September 2010, in conjunction with the 2010 AFL Grand Final, Seven launched its second multi-digital channel 7mate.

In January 2011, the big red 7 logos were expanded to GWN7 and Prime7's rebranding respectively. The news bulletins were renamed as GWN7 News and Prime7 News. GWN and Prime relaunched on 16 January 2011 at 6:00 pm, digital channels are branded as 7two and 7mate.

Seven announced its intention to expand into digital datacasting known as 4ME, a digital channel owned by the Prime Media Group, in December 2011 on channel 64 in Prime7 and regional areas and channel 74 in other areas.

In September 2011, Seven broadcast a report featuring journalist Tim Noonan and writer and adventurer Paul Raffaele visiting Brazil's Suruwaha tribe and describing them as child murderers, "Stone Age" relics, and "one of the worst human rights violators in the world". Survival International, the global movement for tribal people's rights, sent a complaint to Seven outlining the many errors and distortions in the report. After the channel refused to correct the inaccuracies in the program, Survival filed a complaint at the Australian Communications and Media Authority, who opened a formal investigation. In September 2012, the network was found guilty by the press regulator of serious violations of the broadcasting code. The ACMA ruled that the Channel was guilty of breaking its racism clause – having "provoked or perpetuated intense dislike, serious contempt or severe ridicule against the Suruwaha people on the grounds of ... national or ethnic origin ... race [or] religion". It also ruled that the Channel was guilty of broadcasting inaccurate material. Seven sought judicial review, but in June 2014 the Federal Court upheld the ruling.

In October 2012, Seven began cost cutting shedding a number of behind the scenes technical positions and reducing their SNG transponder link capacity on Optus D1 from three (at 12.661,12.671&12.681 GHz) to two (at 12.644&12.653 GHz) which are used by ATN Sydney for Sunrise and national news location uplinks as well as for other local station location uplinks.

In November 2012, Seven changed its on-air theme. This included a new look for programme advisory ratings, programme listings and programme advertisements and promos.

As of 10 December 2013, Seven no longer broadcasts on analogue TV and is now only available through digital TV or digital set-top box.

On 26 June 2015, Racing.com began broadcasting on channel 78 as a joint venture between Seven West Media and Racing Victoria following a blackout of Victorian horse racing by Sky Racing. Initially broadcasting an interim live feed from the Racing.com website, the channel was officially launched on 29 August 2015.

In January 2016, Seven changed its on-air theme. This included a new look for program listings, program advertisements and promos.

On 7 February 2016, during the ad-break of Molly, after months of speculation, Seven officially announced their new channel as 7flix on channel 76. 7flix was launched at 6am on 28 February 2016.

On 10 May 2016, 7HD was revived on channel 70. As a result, 7mate was reduced to standard definition. However, 7HD was restored as a high definition simulcast of Seven's primary channel in Melbourne and Adelaide only; 7HD became a high definition simulcast of 7mate in Seven's other metropolitan markets. This was to allow all markets to view upcoming AFL matches in high definition.

In June 2017, following the acquisition of Yahoo! by Verizon Communications, Seven announced plans to launch a wholly owned standalone service to replace PLUS7. In September 2017, Seven announced the new service would be known as 7plus and would launch in November 2017. As of September 2017, Seven's live streaming service, now named 7Live, is no longer accessible from within the PLUS7 and the Yahoo7 portal.

Seven announced 7food network, a new digital channel, which launched on Channel 74 on 1 December 2018. The announcement with Discovery network follows SBS Food Network losing its deal with Discovery-owned Scripps Network. The channel ceased broadcast on 28 December 2019, just over a year since it launched, though Seven continues to utilise the Food Network branding elsewhere

2020s

In June 2020, Big Brother Australia made a return on the Seven Network with a rebooted program. Hosted by Sonia Kruger, the series was pre-recorded and not live as in previous series, with the new version of Big Brother described like a ‘Survivor in a warehouse’ with producers opting to film at a warehouse in Sydney. The exact location is North Head Sanctuary, also known as The Barracks. On the night Big Brother premiered, Seven also changed their on air theme.

On 19 June 2020, it was announced that The Daily Edition had been cancelled by the Seven Network after 7 years with hosts Sally Obermeder and Ryan Phelan leaving the network. The final episode aired on 26 June 2020

In July 2020, the Seven Network unveiled new logos, for its multichannels, beginning with 7mate then 7two and 7flix respectively. The change in logos also included their on demand platform 7plus now stylised as ″7+″ as part of a major branding overhaul of its multi channel stations.

In March 2021, it was announced that the Seven Network would move out of Martin Place to Eveleigh by the end of 2022 after almost two decades.

On 1 November 2021, Seven West Media announced that it would acquire all the shares and subsidiaries of Prime Media Group. This was Seven West Media's second attempt at purchasing Prime, after its previous attempt in 2019 was thwarted by Australian Community Media boss Antony Catalano and rival WIN Corporation owner Bruce Gordon, who cited Seven's debt problems at the time and its poor ratings performance as their reason for their refusal. This development would mark an end to the Prime branding after 33 years in favour of Seven Network's branding, and would see all news bulletins carry the Seven News brand. Prior to this, Prime7 (and sister GWN7 in regional and remote Western Australia) was the only network not to fully use its metro affiliate branding despite carrying Seven branded promos, since WIN Television (except for WIN News) and Southern Cross Austereo use full Nine and Ten network branding on their stations. It was also announced that Seven would look to expand its investment in local news following the merger. Majority of Prime's shareholders voted in favour of the deal on 23 December, with the sale completed on 31 December.

Commencing June 2022, Seven moved to a national brand in time for the 2022 Commonwealth Games across all of its regions. Introduced to regional audiences on 6 June 2022, viewers in those markets began to see the Prime7 and GWN7 logos transition into the national Seven branding.

Seven announced in October 2022 it would launch a new free-to-air channel, 7Bravo on 15 January 2023 on LCN 75 in metropolitan areas and LCN 65 in regional areas. As a result ishop TV moved from LCN 65 to LCN 67 in the former Prime7 areas. 7Bravo shows huge reality shows and true crime to audiences in Australia. The launch is a partnership between Seven Network and NBCUniversal International Networks & Direct-to-Consumer. 7Bravo and 7plus also is the free-to-air home of NBCUniversal's portfolio of reality content, including the world's most iconic unscripted TV franchises and series from Bravo and E!.

Additional programs

Always Greener, launched in 2001, received two million viewers in its Sunday timeslot, however, it was axed after its second season due to declining audience numbers.

In 2004, Seven launched the internationally well-known game show Deal or No Deal hosted by Andrew O'Keefe, to the 5.30 pm weekday timeslot as a lead-in to the networks' struggling flagship news bulletin replacing the network's long-running and ever-popular Wheel Of Fortune as the show moves to 5pm weekdays, and later in the year Dancing with the Stars, based on the BBC's Strictly Come Dancing, was also launched. The following year, a number of new programmes premiered, from the United States network ABC, including Desperate Housewives and Lost. At the same time, Seven's news and public affairs ratings began to increase in viewers, with Today Tonight beginning to challenge rival A Current Affair, with the new format of Sunrise leading to increased competition with its rival, the Nine Network's Today. Seven's evening news bulletins also started to take the lead with successes in most cities.

The network launched a number of new series in 2006, including Heroes, Prison Break, Dancing with the Stars spin-off It Takes Two, How I Met Your Mother, and My Name Is Earl, and saw long-running series Blue Heelers ending its 13th season run after declining ratings since late 2003. Despite the ongoing success of these programmes, Seven still finished second behind the Nine Network for the fifth time in six years, primarily due to Nine's coverage of the 2006 Commonwealth Games in Melbourne, but the year after, defeated Nine by a significant margin, winning 38 weeks compared to Nine's 2, to become the number one network in Australia.

In 2008, Seven launched new local drama Packed to the Rafters which became the year's top rating show with an average of 1.938 million viewers.

In 2009, a new weekly public affairs show Sunday Night launched in the Sunday 6:30 position to a shakey start but by the end of the year was easily winning its slot and rating up to 250,000 more than rival Nine Network's long-running 60 Minutes.

In 2010, Seven launched new AFL- and NRL-based entertainment shows in an effort to take on Nine's The AFL Footy Show and The NRL Footy Show and provide a bargaining chip in negotiations for AFL and NRL broadcast rights. The AFL-based series was called The Bounce, hosted by Peter Helliar, however, was pulled from the air after just five episodes. An NRL-based series called The Matty Johns Show, hosted by former Footy Show host Matthew Johns, lasted one season.

In 2011, Seven put Packed to the Rafters on hiatus and put new Melbourne drama Winners and Losers in its place, the show won the highest ratings for the night.

In 2013, the Seven Network launched its fifth new drama A Place to Call Home, it also achieved high ratings.

In September 2015, the network began The Chase Australia which is a spinoff of the UK series, The Chase, with Chasers Anne Hegerty (from the UK series), Brydon Coverdale (winner of $307,000 on Million Dollar Minute), Matt Parkinson and Issa Schultz, In 2016, Mark Labbett made his debut as one of the Chasers, joining fellow UK Chaser, Anne Hegerty and in 2018, Shaun Wallace made his debut as its sixth chaser, joining fellow UK chasers Anne Hegerty and Mark Labbett. Seven also launched 800 Words starring Erik Thomson to high ratings, making it the highest rating drama of 2015.

In June 2020, Big Brother Australia made a return on the Seven Network with a rebooted pre-recorded program. It was also announced in 2020, that Seven had acquired the reality series The Voice Australia in 2021 as well as a reboot of Australian Idol.

Seven confirmed in December 2020 it had commissioned a return to a new “all stars” event version of Dancing With The Stars.

The Australian Idol reboot would return to the screens of Seven in 2023.

Programming

New programs introduced in 2005 led to a ratings increase, following a relatively poor 2004.

From 2010, the Seven Network began to implement the tactic of creating a five to 20-minute delay in the scheduled start time of non-live programming after 7:30 pm in an attempt to minimise viewer channel surfing between prime-time shows. This is done by increasing the duration of the commercial breaks and then decreasing them once the prime-time period is over. This tactic not only disrupts viewer recordings of the shows, but has a dramatic effect on their regional affiliates such as Prime and Southern Cross who must adapt their inserted commercials breaks as the live play-out from Seven's Melbourne facility occurs which can cause either both the regional station identification and the Seven identification being displayed with a possible black screen between them or the start of a program being missed entirely by the regional break overlapping.

Local programs
Australian programming shown on the network includes dramas RFDS, soap Home and Away, lifestyle shows; Better Homes and Gardens, gameshows; The Chase Australia, entertainment; The Front Bar, reality; Australia's Got Talent,  Big Brother Australia, Australian Idol, My Kitchen Rules, The Farmer Wants a Wife, SAS Australia, The Voice Australia, Dancing with the Stars: All Stars, factuals; The Force, Border Security, Highway Patrol, Crime Investigation Australia, Beach Cops, Surveillance Oz and Gold Coast Medical.

Foreign programs
Most American programming that airs on Seven and its digital multichannels is sourced from Seven's deals with Disney Platform Distribution and Pixar Animation Studios / 20th Century Studios, Regency Enterprises and Blue Sky Studios (long running, also shared with Disney+), NBCUniversal Global Distribution, StudioCanal, Sony Pictures Television, Warner Bros. International Television Distribution / Warner Bros. Entertainment Inc and Icon Films.

In late 2016, Seven would create a new acquired programming deal with Warner Bros, granting the network programming rights which they currently share with Nine.

On 15 January 2023, Seven would create a new acquired programming deal with NBCUniversal, granting the network programming rights which they currently share with Nine.

Shared overseas programs
Sharing programs is currently a new rule for all the networks after a long absence which have their own programs from 1990s to 2014. All the networks can now share the programs again with each networks of televisions and films, including splitting up the different seasons of the same television series or franchise. Also some television brands can split the different seasons of the same television series by aired on both networks.

Shared American programming that airs on Seven and the Nine Network which its digital multichannels is sourced from Seven and Nine's deals with Warner Bros. International Television Distribution / Warner Bros. Entertainment Inc, NBCUniversal Global Distribution, StudioCanal and Sony Pictures Television.

Shared American programming that airs on Seven and Network 10 which its digital multichannels is sourced from Seven and 10's deals with Warner Bros. International Television Distribution / Warner Bros. Entertainment Inc.

Shared American programming that airs on Seven and ABC and its digital multichannels are sourced from Seven and ABC's deals with NBCUniversal Global Distribution, StudioCanal and Sony Pictures Television.

Former programs
The network formerly broadcast catalogue movie and television titles from Metro-Goldwyn-Mayer produced in the 1990s prior to 2011, Miramax from 2007 to 2012, DreamWorks from 2007 to 2015, Illumination from 2012 to 2016, and Paramount from 1990s to 2022. Metro-Goldwyn-Mayer, DreamWorks, Paramount, Miramax, and Illumination now belong to the Nine Network while Paramount and Miramax also now belong to Network 10. Nine revived Metro-Goldwyn-Mayer, DreamWorks, Paramount, Miramax and Illumination broadcast rights and 10 revived Paramount and Miramax broadcast rights.

On 7two, in the early 2010s, they aired classic and silver-screen movies from the Sony Pictures (Columbia & TriStar) catalog, but all of those films moved back to ABC and Nine respectively.

In 2018 it was reported that Seven had formed an agreement with 20th Century Fox to air selected Fox programming.

Previously, the network had output deals with Sony Pictures Television and NBCUniversal, however changed its deals with both in mid-2013. Seven renegotiated its NBCUniversal deal to continue rights to air existing popular NBC co-produced programs including Downton Abbey and Mrs Brown's Boys, as well as NBC News content. Commiserate with the American network's own slump, Seven has not found huge success with an NBC primetime series since 2007. With Sony, Seven has signed a three-year minimum quota deal, where by Seven will agree to purchase a set number of Sony produced US primetime series and selected films each year.

News and current affairs

The Seven Network's news service is called Seven News (formerly Australian Television News (ATVN) and Seven National News). After trailing for many decades to Nine News (previously National Nine News) and 10 News First (previously Ten Eyewitness News, Ten News at Five, Ten Evening News and Ten News: First at Five) in most markets, Seven rebounded effective from February 2005 onwards, and claimed to be Australia's number one television news and current affairs service. Seven News produces Sunrise, The Morning Show, Weekend Sunrise, Seven Morning News, Seven Afternoon News, Seven News (the flagship locally produced 6 pm bulletins) and The Latest: Seven News. During the early hours of 4 am to 6 am, Seven rebroadcasts some of American television network NBC's news and current affairs programming, including Today and Meet the Press. Since 1988, Seven also adopted NBC News' main theme, The Mission, as the theme for Seven's news programming.

Exclusive contracts with NBC News, ITN and TV3 (New Zealand) for international news coverage.

In recent years, under the guidance of former long-time Nine News chief Peter Meakin, Seven's news and current affairs division has produced more locally focused content, which has been lifting ratings for key markets such as Sydney and Melbourne. Since February 2005, the ratings of Deal or No Deal, Seven News and Today Tonight have gradually increased. Seven News was the highest-rating news service nationally in both the 2005 and 2006 ratings seasons. A key aspect of Seven's recent ratings dominance in news and current affairs has been attributed to Deal or No Deals (and, since late 2015, The Chase Australia) top rating audience, which provides Seven News with a large lead-in audience. Between 2007 and 2010 inclusive, Seven News completed a clean sweep across the five capital cities in terms of being the most watched 6 pm news bulletin. On 5 July 2008, Channel Seven introduced a watermark on news and current affairs programmes.

Sport

Seven is a major purchaser of Australian sports broadcasting rights. Seven's most popular recurring sporting events include the Olympic Games, Commonwealth Games, Big Bash League, Women's Big Bash League, Australian Test Cricket, World Rally Championship, Australian Rally Championship, Australian Off Road Championship, AFL Premiership Season, the Australian PGA Championship golf, the Australian Open Golf, the Australian Open Tennis until Seven lost the rights in 2018, Bledisloe Cup Rugby, Mount Buller World Aerials, the Sydney to Hobart Yacht Race, the Tri-Nations Rugby, and horse racing events including the Melbourne Cup Carnival until Seven lost the rights in 2018, and Queensland's annual Magic Millions race day.

The network had the exclusive coverage of the 2000 Sydney Olympics, which attracted a TV audience of over 6.5 million Australians for the opening and closing ceremonies. The broadcast also ran on the short-lived C7 Sport subscription channel.

On 25 January 2001, Network Ten, Nine Network, and pay TV provider Foxtel won the rights from Seven to televise AFL games from 2002 to 2006. This ended Seven's famous 45-year run as the exclusive AFL football broadcaster. On 5 January 2006 the Australian Football League accepted a bid from Seven and Ten to broadcast AFL games from 2007 to 2011 at a cost of A$780 million. Since 2011, Seven has been the exclusive free-to-air broadcaster of the AFL Premiership Season to at least 2031.

Seven had exclusive Australian free-to-air, pay television, online and mobile telephony broadcast rights to the 2008 Summer Olympics in Beijing. The live telecast of the XXIX Olympiad was shared by both the Seven Network and SBS Television. Seven broadcast the opening and closing ceremonies and mainstream sports including swimming, athletics, rowing, cycling and gymnastics. In stark contrast, SBS TV provided complementary coverage focused on long-form events such as soccer, road cycling, volleyball, and table tennis.

From 2016, Seven became the home of the Summer Olympic Games, Winter Olympic Games and the Summer Paralympic Games. The Network secured the Australian broadcast rights to the Olympic Games. In October 2020, it was named as the Australian broadcast service for the 2022 Winter Olympics in Beijing.

In 2016, the Seven Network won the broadcasting rights deal to be the main broadcaster of the 2017 Rugby League World Cup in Australia, beating the other regular rugby league broadcasting channels of Fox League and the Nine Network to secure the deal. 

The Seven Network also screened the 2018 Commonwealth Games on the Gold Coast in April 2018, and the 2022 Commonwealth Games from Birmingham.

In 2018, the Seven Network, in conjunction with Foxtel, acquired free-to-air broadcasting rights to cricket in Australia. This ended Nine's famous 45-year run as the exclusive cricket broadcaster and Ten's five-year run as the exclusive Big Bash League broadcaster. The network will televise all men's international tests matches, 43 Big Bash League Matches, all women's Internationals (T20Is, ODIs and Tests) and 23 Women's Big Bash League Matches. The six-year deal starts in 2018/19 and runs until 2023/24. In 2023, Seven announced that it reached an agreement with Cricket Australia to extend its media rights from the 2024-25 season to the 2030-31 season. The new, seven-year agreement between Seven and Cricket Australia includes two Ashes Tests Series as well as two Indian tours of Australia. In addition, Cricket Australia will revamp the BBL to create a shorter tournament that will run for five to six weeks to screen on the Seven network.

In 2020, Seven regained the TV rights to the Supercars Championship, sharing the rights with Foxtel in a deal worth $200 million for 5 years (2021–2025). The new deal has Seven Sport show seven rounds of the Supercars Championship live and showing highlights of the rounds it is not able to televise

Availability
Seven is a standard definition channel through digital TV.  There was a 1080i high definition version until it was replaced by the youth orientated 7mate channel, before this change on 18 March 2007, test simulcasts for 1080i commenced in the Sydney and Melbourne markets, Adelaide and Perth followed on 24 June 2007, with Brisbane following on 25 June 2007, and regional Queensland on 26 June 2007. Prior to this, the Seven Network provided a 576p enhanced-definition service.

Seven's core programming is fibre fed out of HSV Melbourne to its sister stations and regional affiliates with ATN Sydney providing national news and current affairs programming.  The receiving stations and affiliates then insert their own localised news and advertising, which is then broadcast in metropolitan areas and regional areas of Queensland, New South Wales, Victoria and Western Australia through owned-and-operated stations: ATN Sydney, HSV Melbourne, BTQ Brisbane, SAS Adelaide and TVW Perth; as well as its owned regional stations: CBN Southern NSW, AMV regional Victoria, NSW and SA border areas, PTV Mildura, NEN northern NSW, Seven Regional WA regional Western Australia and Seven Queensland regional Queensland. Seven Network programming is also carried into other areas of regional Australia by third-party affiliates like SCA-owned Seven Regional in South Australia, Tasmania, Darwin and remote areas of central and eastern Australia; and WIN Television in South Australia and the Murrumbridgee Irrigation Area of New South Wales.

On 1 April 2008, ATN Sydney began broadcasting a digital signal to Foxtel and Austar's satellite and cable subscribers.

Current
7HD

The 7HD multichannel was launched in October 2007 until 25 September 2010 and later revived on 10 May 2016. The revival version initially broadcast split services: identical main channel programming for Melbourne and Adelaide & continuous programming from 7mate for other metropolitan cities, but in 1080i MPEG-4 HD via Freeview. The split was implemented to allow broadcast of AFL matches in HD. By 16 December 2016, it quietly shifted to the main channel programming on a long-term basis for Sydney, Brisbane and Perth.

7plus7plus is a video on demand and catch up TV service wholly owned and run by the Seven Network. It launched on 27 November 2017 as a replacement for PLUS7, a catch-up TV service jointly owned by Seven Network and Yahoo! which closed on 31 March 2018. It offers on demand episodes of television series and a live streaming service providing live access to Seven, 7two, 7mate, 7flix and Racing.com.

Following the acquisition of Yahoo! by Verizon Communications in June 2017, Seven announced plans to launch a wholly owned standalone service to replace PLUS7 within the following six months. In September 2017, Seven announced the new service would be known as 7plus and would launch in November 2017.

The service is available in HD, and there are plans to add Chromecast and Apple Airplay support at a later date.

AFL Premiership Season and Cricket matches are not accessible through the 7plus live streaming service due to the digital broadcast rights being owned by Telstra Media and Kayo Sports respectively. Border Security International repeats play on the channel's live stream in the event's place until the match is over and then returns to normal programming.

On 23 July 2020, 7plus introduced a new logo styled as 7+.

Past
PLUS7PLUS7 was a catch up TV service run by the Seven Network through its Yahoo7 joint venture with Yahoo!. The service became available on 18 January 2010. Following the introduction of 7plus, PLUS7 was shut down, becoming unavailable on most platforms from 12 December 2017, and on remaining devices on 31 March 2018.

Some titles were exclusively available in Australia on PLUS7, including Other Space and Sin City Saints, as well as the British version of My Kitchen Rules, which were not broadcast on the Seven Network. In 2014, PLUS7 became the first commercial television catch-up service to provide optional closed captioning on most of its programming.

PLUS7 was available across several platforms including iOS mobile operating systems (e.g. iPhone, iPad & iPod Touch), Apple TV, Xbox 360, Xbox One, PlayStation 3, PlayStation 4, Windows 10, Sony internet-enabled TVs & Blu-ray players, LG internet-enabled TVs, Samsung internet-enabled TVs & Blu-ray players, Panasonic internet-enabled TVs, Hisense internet-enabled TVs, Humax set top boxes, Windows Mobile 7, 8, 8.1 and 10 and Samsung devices running Android OS 4.0+ and above.

7food network7food network''' was a short-lived Australian free-to-air television channel owned by the Seven Network which launched on 1 December 2018. The channel marked the start of Seven's new deal with Discovery, Inc., immediately after the end of SBS's previous deal with Discovery which saw the creation of SBS Food (formerly SBS Food Network) in 2015. The channel featured shows about food and cooking from around the world. The channel ceased broadcasting on 28 December 2019 after garnering lower than expected ratings, and replaced by a HD simulcast of 7mate from 16 January 2020.

Logo and identity history

The network's first logo produced and used across the metropolitan stations in the early 1970s featured the numeral seven inside a ring (similar to the Circle 7 logo used mostly by ABC for its owned-and-operated stations which ATN-7 used from 1968 to 1969). However, in some states from as early back as 1967 the "Seven eye" appeared and continued right through to 1975.  Colour television was introduced across the network and the country on 1 March 1975, along with a new logo incorporating a bright ring of the colours of the visual light spectrum. This logo was used nationally until 23 January 1989, when the recently renamed Seven Network introduced a new red logo with the circle modified to incorporate the "7" (similar to the logo then used by WJLA-TV in Washington).  The new logo was rolled out along with evening soap Home and Away and a relaunched Seven Nightly News (later to become Seven News).

The current ribbon logo was launched to coincide with the new millennium celebration on 1 January 2000 and the 2000 Summer Olympics held in Sydney. The ribbon logo was used between 2000 and 2003 in five colour variants: red, orange, yellow, green and blue, to symbolise passion, involving, fun, life and energy respectively and represents the five stations of the network. The logo was simplified in 2003, effectively becoming simply two angled trapezoids, losing its gradient, shadows and colour-coded usages to become solid red but first it was used in solid white as an on-screen bug from 2000. In 2012, the Seven logo was slightly modified with the shape of it remaining the same, the upper right corner was lighter red than the remaining logo. On 1 February 2016, it reverted to red trapezoids.

 Slogans 

The Seven Network's TV ad campaigns tend to follow NBC (mostly due to Seven's semi-close ties with the American network), but at times also used some imaging from fellow US networks ABC and FOX.

Each state has from time to time had their own specific slogans, but the following were the network's national identities:

1959: You're in Tune When You're Tuned to Seven1969 – February 1975: The Seven Revolution1974: Looking Better Than Ever! 
1975–1976: Seven Colors Your World1976–1979: The Color Machine (a.k.a. Seven Colors Your World/Who Colors Your World?)
1979–1980: You're on Seven1981–1982: Channel 7, All The Best1983: Channel 7, Watch Us Now1984: Be There 
1985–1988: Let's All Be There 
1986–1987: Say Hello 
1988: Let's Celebrate '88 
1988: Australian Television Network 
1 January 1989 – Summer 1989/90: Only the Best on 7 
1990–1995: Seven 
1990: In The Mood 
1991: Yeah! 
1992: Good Vibrations 
1993–1994: It Has to Be ... Seven1995: Handmade Television 
February 1995 – June 1996: Discover It All on SevenJune 1996 – April 1999: Everyone's Home on Seven1 May 1999 – 14 September 2003: The One to Watch2001: The Australian Television Network6 July – 31 August 2003: See Things Differently14 September – November 2003: Lucky Number Seven 
2004: 7NOW26 December 2004 – 16 January 2011November 2012 – December 2019: Gottaloveit16 January 2011 – November 2012: One Place2020–present: Better Together''

Awards 

Due to Seven's coverage of the 2008 Summer Olympics, the International Olympic Committee awarded Seven the 'Golden Rings' award for "Best Olympic Programme". The award is given for the best overall Olympic coverage.

At the 2018 Sport Australia media awards, Seven won the "Best coverage of a sporting event" award for the coverage of the 2018 Commonwealth Games in Gold Coast.

The Seven Network's ground-breaking coverage of the Tokyo 2020 Summer Olympic Games saw them win three awards (gold, silver and bronze) at the International Olympic Committee’s coveted Golden Rings Awards.

See also

 List of Australian television series
 7HD
 7two
 7mate
 7flix
 7Bravo
 Red Heart, joint venture with Granada plc

Notes

References and notes

External links

 

 
Television networks in Australia
Television channels and stations established in 1956
English-language television stations in Australia
1956 establishments in Australia